Liam Gill may refer to
 Liam Gill (rugby union) (born 1992), Australian international rugby union player.
 Liam Gill (snowboarder) (born 2003), Canadian Olympic snowboarder.